Gizzard Creek is a stream in Wayne County in the U.S. state of Missouri. It is a tributary of Turkey Creek.

It is uncertain why the name "Gizzard" was applied to this creek.

See also
List of rivers of Missouri

References

Rivers of Wayne County, Missouri
Rivers of Missouri